Vladimír Vlk (born 23 April 1968 in Skalica) is a Slovak former professional ice hockey defenceman,

Career 
Vlk played in the Slovak Extraliga for HK Dukla Trenčín, HK 36 Skalica, HC Slovan Bratislava, HK SKP Poprad and HC '05 Banská Bystrica. He also played in the Czech Extraliga for AC ZPS Zlín and HC Oceláři Třinec.

Vlk was a member of the Slovakia national team and played in the 1997 and 1999 Men's World Ice Hockey Championships.

Career statistics

References

External links

 Article at Čas.sk

1968 births
Living people
HC '05 Banská Bystrica players
HK Dukla Trenčín players
SHK Hodonín players
MHk 32 Liptovský Mikuláš players
HK Nitra players
HC Oceláři Třinec players
HK Poprad players
HK 91 Senica players
HK 36 Skalica players
Slovak ice hockey defencemen
HC Slovan Bratislava players
PSG Berani Zlín players
Sportspeople from Skalica
Czechoslovak ice hockey defencemen
Slovak expatriate ice hockey players in the Czech Republic